Shizarodon is a genus of primate related to lemuriforms that lived in Oman during the early Oligocene.

References

Bibliography 

 
 

Prehistoric strepsirrhines
Eocene primates
Fossil taxa described in 1993
Prehistoric mammals of Asia
Prehistoric primate genera